Wickham  is an inner suburb of Newcastle, New South Wales, Australia, located  from Newcastle's central business district.

History
The Aboriginal people, in this area, the Awabakal, were the first people of this land.

Wickham which was a Misspelling of Whickham, a suburb of Newcastle upon Tyne in the north of England. Means village by the creek. Wickham was proclaimed a Municipality in the NSW Government Gazette, 27 February 1871, largely by the efforts of James Hannell, who became Wickham's first mayor.

Transport
Wickham railway station was served by NSW TrainLink's Central Coast & Newcastle Line and Hunter Line. The railway line is part of the Newcastle-Maitland line, the first section of the Main North line from Sydney to the New England region, opened in 1857. It closed on 25 December 2014, when the Newcastle line was truncated to Hamilton to allow construction of the Newcastle Light Rail line. Newcastle Interchange opened on 15 October 2017. It connects with the Newcastle Light Rail.

Sport
Wickham is a well represented in the Newcastle cricket competitions. The local district team is known as the HamWicks (a combination of the suburbs Hamilton and Wickham).

Two rugby union clubs are also based in Wickham; Hamilton Hawks and Newcastle Griffins. Hamilton Hawks is one of the largest clubs in the Newcastle Premier Rugby competition fielding men's, women's and junior teams. Newcastle Griffins emerged from the former Tech College and Port Hunter clubs and fields a team in the NHRU Divisional competition.

Gallery

References

External links
 Battery Recycling Provider

Suburbs of Newcastle, New South Wales